Kyle Ezell (born Jonathan Kyle Ezell in Lawrenceburg, Tennessee) is an American urban planning practitioner, writer, and theorist.  Ezell focuses on vibrant downtowns and expressing local culture in the built environment. He is currently a professor and head of the undergraduate planning program of the Knowlton School at Ohio State University.

Ezell received a Master of Science in Geography from South Dakota State University in 1994. Prior to joining Ohio State University's Knowlton School, he practiced as an urban planner in Chattanooga, Tennessee, Dublin, Ohio, and Columbus, Ohio. Most notably he has published a number of urban focused books including: Get Urban!, and Retire Downtown.

Partial bibliography 
Ezell, Kyle, 2006. Retire Downtown: The Lifestyle Destination for Active 
Retirees and Empty Nesters. Andrews McMeel Publishing 
 
Ezell, Kyle, 2004. Get Urban! The Complete Guide to City Living. Capital 
Books.

Notes

External links 
  Knowlton School

American urban planners
Living people
Urban theorists
Ohio State University faculty
American male writers
Year of birth missing (living people)
People from Lawrenceburg, Tennessee
Writers from Columbus, Ohio